"The End of Our Road" is a single written by Roger Penzabene, Norman Whitfield and Barrett Strong in 1967. Originally recorded by Gladys Knight & the Pips and issued as a single in 1968, the Pips' version of the song, became another top forty hit for the family group as it peaked at number fifteen on the pop singles chart and number five on the R&B singles chart.

Background
As with the last two songs in Penzabene's trilogy for The Temptations, "I Wish It Would Rain" and "I Could Never Love Another (After Loving You)", "The End of Our Road" talked about the demise of a couple's relationship. The sentiment behind the song's words, as lyricist Penzabene wrote his songs as personal statements to his wife, was about publicizing his pain of his own marriage falling apart.  Unable to handle the extreme pain and hurt caused by this, he wrote the songs, drawing from his real-life heart break. After all three songs were completed and recorded, Penzabene committed suicide.

Gladys Knight & the Pips version
Lead vocals by Gladys Knight
Background vocals by Merald "Bubba" Knight, William Guest and Edward Patten
Instrumentation by The Funk Brothers

Chart positions

The Marvin Gaye recording
Much like the minor controversy with "I Heard It Through the Grapevine", Whitfield produced a different version of the song with Marvin Gaye, who issued the song in early 1970. The song peaked at number forty on the pop charts. It was the first song counted down on the first show of the syndicated radio countdown program American Top 40 on the weekend of July 4, 1970.

Lead vocals by Marvin Gaye
Background vocals by The Andantes
Instrumentation by The Funk Brothers

Chart positions

References

1967 songs
1968 singles
1970 singles
Gladys Knight & the Pips songs
Marvin Gaye songs
Motown singles
Songs written by Barrett Strong
Songs written by Norman Whitfield
Songs written by Rodger Penzabene
Tamla Records singles